Treffor Elliott Davies (13 March 1938 – 21 December 2013) was an English cricketer who played 20 first-class matches for Worcestershire between 1955 and 1961.

Davies made his first-class debut for Worcestershire against Oxford University at The University Parks in June 1955; he scored 11 not out in his only innings and took one wicket in each innings (those of John Baker and Stanley Metcalfe).
He also played against Cambridge University and Somerset that season and did not appear in first-class cricket again for five years.

Davies returned to the Worcestershire side in 1960. He did not bowl at all that year, although he did score the first of his three half-centuries: 51* against Middlesex near the end of the season.
He played much more (11 matches) in 1961, and hit two fifties, the higher of these being the 76 he scored against Glamorgan in late June.
That was in fact his penultimate appearance in first-class cricket: his only other game was against Northamptonshire a week later.

Davies died on 21 December 2013, at the age of 75 from lung cancer. He was married to Marina for fifty years and they had two children.

References

External links

1938 births
2013 deaths
English cricketers
Worcestershire cricketers